"Mountain Greenery" is a popular song composed by Richard Rodgers, with lyrics by Lorenz Hart for the musical The Garrick Gaieties (1926). It was first performed on stage by Sterling Holloway.

Lyrics
The lyrics display Hart's characteristic use of enjambement and witty and unexpected internal rhymes e.g. 'lover let' and 'coverlet' and 'keener re...' rhymed with 'beanery':

Notable recordings
Roger Wolfe Kahn and his Orchestra - recorded on May 27, 1926 for Victor. 
Frank Crumit - recorded for Victor on July 29, 1926.
Bing Crosby - Bing Sings Whilst Bregman Swings (1956) recorded on June 12, 1956. 
Ella Fitzgerald - Ella Fitzgerald Sings the Rodgers & Hart Songbook (1956)
Patti Page - for her album In the Land of Hi-Fi (1956).
Mel Tormé (1956) (a top-five hit in the UK)
Barbara Lea - included in the album Lea in Love (1957).
The Supremes (1966) The Supremes Sing Rodgers & Hart
Tony Bennett (1973) for his album The Rodgers & Hart Songs with The Ruby Braff-George Barnes Quartet.
Mickey Mouse, Minnie Mouse and the Fun Songs Kids - Mickey's Fun Songs: Campout at Walt Disney World (1994)

In popular culture
It was featured in the MGM film Words and Music (1948 film) (1948) when it was performed by Perry Como, Allyn Ann McLerie and chorus. 
Dick Van Dyke and Mary Tyler Moore, in character as Rob and Laura Petrie, performed the song in an episode of The Dick Van Dyke Show titled "The Sleeping Brother".

References

Songs with music by Richard Rodgers
Songs with lyrics by Lorenz Hart
1926 songs
Mel Tormé songs